Palmar de Junco is where in 1874 the first official game of Cuban baseball was played.  It was once owned by the del Junco family.  It is located at Calzada Esteban between Monserrate and San Ignacio streets in the neighborhood of Pueblo Nuevo, Matanzas, Cuba.

References
 Historia del Palmar de Junco, Israel M. Moliner (Matanzas, Cuba:  de Museo, 1960)

Sports venues in Cuba
Buildings and structures in Matanzas